The 2003 National Assembly for Wales election was the second general election to the National Assembly for Wales.  It was held on 1 May 2003. The election was characterised by a resurgence for the Labour Party, whilst Plaid Cymru saw a reduction in support and the number of Assembly Members they returned. Having won thirty seats, one short of a majority, Labour chose to govern in minority without a coalition partner.

This election also saw the returning of John Marek as an independent member of the Assembly. Of the 60 members elected, 30 were male and 30 were female.

It was held on the same day as the 2003 Scottish Parliament election and 2003 United Kingdom local elections.

Party leaders in 2003
 Welsh Labour - Rhodri Morgan
 Plaid Cymru - Ieuan Wyn Jones
 Welsh Conservatives - Nicholas Bourne
 Welsh Liberal Democrats - Michael James German
 UK Independence Party (UKIP) - Jeffrey Titford

National vote
 Overall turnout - 38.2%

|-
| style="background-color:white" colspan=15 | 
|-
!rowspan=3 colspan=2 | Parties
!colspan=10 | Additional member system
!rowspan=2 colspan=5 | Total seats
|-
!colspan=5 |Constituency
!colspan=5 |Region
|-
! Votes !! % !! +/− !! Seats !! +/− 
! Votes !! % !! +/− !! Seats !! +/−
! Total !! +/− !! %
|-

|-
|   || Total || 851,357 ||  ||  || 40 ||   || 849,552 ||  ||   || 20 ||  || 60 ||   ||
|}

Votes summary

Constituency and Regional Summary

Mid and West Wales

|-
! colspan=2 |Constituency
! Elected member
! Result

North Wales

|-
! colspan=2 |Constituency
! Elected member
! Result

South Wales Central

|-
! colspan=2 |Constituency
! Elected member
! Result

South Wales East

|-
! colspan=2 |Constituency
! Elected member
! Result

South Wales West

|-
! colspan=2 |Constituency
! Elected member
! Result

See also
 2003 Scottish Parliament election
 2003 United Kingdom local elections

References

External links
Welsh Assembly Elections 2003

2003
2003 elections in the United Kingdom
Senedd
2003 in Wales
2000s elections in Wales